Thomas Nyemeg (born 8 October 1957) is a Cameroonian former cyclist. He competed in the individual road race event at the 1980 Summer Olympics.

References

External links
 

1957 births
Living people
Cameroonian male cyclists
Olympic cyclists of Cameroon
Cyclists at the 1980 Summer Olympics
Place of birth missing (living people)